Loa is a genus of nematodes belonging to the family Filariidae.

Species:

Loa extraocularis 
Loa inquirenda 
Loa loa 
Loa papionis

References

Nematodes